City-County Building may refer to:
 Coleman A. Young Municipal Center, Detroit, Michigan
 Denver City and County Building, Denver, Colorado
 Indianapolis City-County Building, Indianapolis, Indiana
 Knoxville City-County Building, Knoxville, Tennessee
 Pittsburgh City-County Building, Pittsburgh, Pennsylvania
 Salt Lake City and County Building, Salt Lake City, Utah
 City and County Building (Cheyenne, Wyoming)